Chander Nagar is a city and municipal council in the Ghaziabad district of Uttar Pradesh, India.

Geography

Cities and towns in Ghaziabad district, India